Kelly Kryczka (born July 8, 1961) is a Canadian competitor in synchronized swimming, world champion and Olympic medalist.

Career
Kelly Kryczka began synchronized swimming at the Calgary Glencoe Club and then moved on to train with the Calgary Aquabelles. She and Helen Vanderburg earned gold in duet at the 1979 Canadian Aquatic Championships, a gold medal in duet at the 1979 Pan American Games in San Juan, and gold at the Federation Internationale De Natation Amateur Cup in 1979. Kryczka won the solo and duet events at the Canadian Aquatic Championships in 1980.

After Helen Vanderburg retired in 1979 Kryczka paired with Sharon Hambrook. They received a gold medal in duet at the 1982 World Aquatics Championships in Guayaquil, where Kryczka also received a silver medal in solo and a gold medal in the team event.

Kryczka won a silver medal in the women's duet with Sharon Hambrook at the 1984 Summer Olympics in Los Angeles, the first year that the sport was recognized by the Olympics.

Honours
Kelly Kryczka was inducted into the Canadian Olympic Hall of Fame in 1996, and the Alberta Sports Hall of Fame in 1980.

Family
Kryczka is the daughter of Alberta politician Karen Kryczka, and the niece of Joe Kryczka.

References

External links
Canadian Olympic Hall of Fame
Alberta Sports Hall of Fame
 

1961 births
Living people
Alberta Sports Hall of Fame inductees
Canadian synchronized swimmers
Medalists at the 1984 Summer Olympics
Olympic medalists in synchronized swimming
Olympic silver medalists for Canada
Olympic synchronized swimmers of Canada
Pan American Games gold medalists for Canada
Pan American Games medalists in synchronized swimming
Swimmers from Calgary
Synchronized swimmers at the 1979 Pan American Games
Synchronized swimmers at the 1984 Summer Olympics
World Aquatics Championships medalists in synchronised swimming
Medalists at the 1979 Pan American Games